Air Chief Marshal Sir Glenn Lester Torpy,  (born 27 July 1953) is a retired senior Royal Air Force (RAF) commander. He was a fast jet pilot in the late 1970s and 1980s, saw active service during the Gulf War and then went on to higher command. He was the air component commander on Operation Telic (British operations in Iraq) and served as Chief of the Air Staff, the professional head of the RAF, from 2006 to 2009. In that role Torpy hosted the RAF's biggest air display in two decades, and argued for consolidation of all British air power in the hands of the RAF.

Early life
The son of Gordon Torpy and Susan Torpy (née Lindsey), Torpy obtained a BSc degree in aeronautical engineering from Imperial College London.

Military career
Torpy joined the Royal Air Force as a pilot officer on 8 September 1974, and spent his early career, after he left the RAF College Cranwell, undertaking flying duties in Jaguar aircraft before qualifying as a weapons instructor on Hawk aircraft. He was promoted to flying officer on 8 March 1975, with seniority backdated to 8 June 1973, flight lieutenant on 8 December 1975, and squadron leader on 1 July 1983.

Torpy's early commands included a tour as a squadron leader in Tornado aircraft before being appointed Officer Commanding No. 13 Squadron in 1989. Having been promoted to wing commander on 1 July 1989, Torpy saw active service during the Gulf War with No. 13 Squadron and was subsequently awarded the Distinguished Service Order. He was made personal staff officer to the Air Officer Commanding RAF Strike Command in 1992.

Promoted to group captain on 1 July 1993, Torpy was appointed station commander at RAF Bruggen, Germany, in 1995. After promotion to air commodore on 1 January 1997, he attended the Royal College of Defence Studies in 1997. He was appointed Assistant Chief of Staff (Operations) at Permanent Joint Headquarters in Northwood in 1998 and director of air operations at the Ministry of Defence in 1999. Torpy was appointed a Commander of the Order of the British Empire in the 2000 New Year Honours and became Assistant Chief of Defence Staff (Operations) at the Ministry of Defence in 2000.

From 2001 to 2003 Torpy was Air Officer Commanding No. 1 Group, and also served as the air component commander for Operation Telic (British operations in Iraq). He was awarded the Legion of Merit (Degree of Officer) from the United States in "recognition of gallant and distinguished services during coalition operations in Iraq" in 2003. He was promoted to air vice marshal on 1 January 2001, and to air marshal on 18 July 2003.

From 2003 to 2004 Torpy was deputy commander-in-chief at RAF Strike Command. On 26 July 2004, he was appointed chief of joint operations at the Permanent Joint Headquarters in Northwood. He was appointed Knight Commander of the Order of the Bath in the 2005 New Year Honours.

With promotion to air chief marshal on 13 April 2006, Torpy became Chief of the Air Staff and an air aide-de-camp to Her Majesty the Queen on 13 April 2006. He was appointed Knight Grand Cross of the Order of the Bath in the 2008 Birthday Honours. In July 2008, Torpy hosted the RAF's biggest air display in two decades, as a  procession of aircraft flew past the queen to commemorate the service's 90th anniversary. Controversially, in June 2009, he argued for consolidation of all British air power in the hands of the RAF, effectively questioning the future of the Royal Navy's jet aircraft.

Torpy retired from the RAF in July 2009, and became senior military advisor to BAE Systems. He is also Chairman of the Trustees of the RAF Museum and a governor of Haberdashers' Aske's Boys' School.

Personal life
Torpy married Christine Jackson in 1977. His interests include golf, hill walking, military history and cabinet making.

References

External links

Debrett's – Air Chief Marshal Sir Glenn Torpy

|-

|-

|-

|-

|-

|-

1953 births
Living people
Graduates of the Royal College of Defence Studies
People from Ely, Cambridgeshire
Graduates of the Royal Air Force College Cranwell
Alumni of Imperial College London
Commanders of the Order of the British Empire
Knights Grand Cross of the Order of the Bath
Companions of the Distinguished Service Order
Officers of the Legion of Merit
Royal Air Force air marshals
Chiefs of the Air Staff (United Kingdom)
Fellows of the Royal Aeronautical Society
Royal Air Force personnel of the Gulf War
Military personnel from Cambridgeshire
Royal Air Force personnel of the Iraq War
British military leaders of the Iraq War
20th-century Royal Air Force personnel
21st-century Royal Air Force personnel